The Evangelical Reformed Church of the Canton Freiburg is a cantonal Reformed state church in Fribourg.
In 2004 it had 16 parishes and 38,000 members, served by 35 ministers. It was officially organised in 1530, the official languages are French and German. From the parishes 3 are dual languages, 5 are French and 8 are German language worship.

In 1530 Murten, Kerzers, Motier, Meyriez, Ferenbalm converted to the Reformed faith. The other parts of freiburg stayed Catholic. In 1854 the Reformed church planted more congregations. In the 19th century Reformed churches and schools was planted. In 2001 in Romont-Chatel-St. Denis was divided into 2 separate parishes. Women ordination is allowed.

External links 
Freiburg Reformed State Church website

References 

Canton of Fribourg
Religion in Switzerland
Reformed cantonal churches in Switzerland